Yepes is a surname. Notable people with the name include:

 Gerard Yepes (born 2002), Spanish footballer
 Mario Yepes (born 1976), Colombian footballer
 Narciso Yepes (1927–1997), Spanish guitarist
 Tomás de Yepes (c. 1595–1674), Spanish painter
 Juan de Yepes y Álvarez (1542–1591), birth name of John of the Cross, Spanish mystic, Catholic saint, Carmelite friar and priest

See also
 Yepes, Spanish town
 Yepez